Grant Russell is an American football quarterback for the Carolina Cobras of the National Arena League (NAL). 

Russell saw limited action at Ohio Dominican as a freshman. During the 2015 season, he started eleven games. He became a Harlon Hill Trophy candidate in 2016 and was named the Great Midwest Athletic Conference Player of the Year as a senior in 2017.

Early life
Russell attended Newark High School in Newark, Ohio, where he was a multi-year letterman in baseball, basketball and football.

College career
After not receiving much consideration from Division I football schools, Russell enrolled at Ohio Dominican University, where he would join the football team.

Career Statistics 
700/1022 8729 Passing Yards
73 TD’s 20 INT’s 
14 Rushing TD’s

2017: D2Football.com Honorable Mention All-American…G-MAC Player of the Year…First Team All-Great Midwest…Harlon Hill Trophy Candidate…Don Hansen Football Gazette Second Team All-Region 1

2016: Harlon Hill Trophy Candidate…Honorable Mention All-GLIAC…Led GLIAC and ranked second in nation in completion percentage (69.9 percent)…Led GLIAC with 241 completions, ranking 22nd nationally…Also ranked 25th nationally in pass efficiency (151.9) and 39th in passing touchdowns (23) and yards (2,730)..Ran for 331 yards and three touchdowns as well

2015: Started 11 games…Completed 223-of-351 passes for 2,626 yards and 18 touchdowns against just six interceptions

2014: Appeared in eight games…Completed 16-of-22 passes for 191 yards and two touchdowns on the season…Also ran for 47 yards and two scores

Professional career
On March 7, 2019, Russell was assigned to the Baltimore Brigade of the Arena Football League (AFL). On March 11, 2019, Russell was traded to the Columbus Destroyers for future considerations. After being named the backup to Danny Southwick to open the season, Russell entered the Destroyers' first game of the regular season in relief of an ineffective Southwick. Russell completed his first ever professional touchdown to Jenson Stoshak in the 3rd quarter. He later ran in a score during the 4th quarter.

References

External links
 Ohio Dominican bio

Living people
American football quarterbacks
Players of American football from Ohio
Ohio Dominican Panthers football players
Baltimore Brigade players
Columbus Destroyers players
Year of birth missing (living people)
Carolina Cobras (NAL) players